Thermothrix is a genus of Gram-negative, non-spore-forming, thermophilic, motile bacteria with a single polar flagellum of the family Burkholderiaceae and class  Betaproteobacteria.

See also
 List of bacteria genera
 List of bacterial orders

References

Burkholderiaceae
Bacteria genera